The Central Committee of the 28th Congress of the Communist Party of the Soviet Union (CPSU) was in session from 1990 until the party was banned on 6 November 1991. It elected, at its 1st Plenary Session, the Politburo and the Secretariat (and individual secretaries) of the 28th term.

Plenums
The Central Committee was not a permanent institution. It convened plenary sessions. Four CC plenary sessions and two plenary sessions held in conjunction with the convening of the Central Control Commission were held between the 28th Congress and the party's banning on 6 November 1991. When the CC was not in session, decision-making power was vested in the internal bodies of the CC itself; that is, the Politburo and the Secretariat. None of these bodies were permanent either; typically they convened several times a month.

Composition

References

Citations

Bibliography
 

Central Committee of the Communist Party of the Soviet Union
1990 in the Soviet Union
1991 in the Soviet Union
1990 in Russia
1991 in Russia
1990 establishments in the Soviet Union
1991 disestablishments in the Soviet Union
1990 elections in the Soviet Union
1991 elections in the Soviet Union